The Salt Lake City Bees was a primary moniker of the minor league baseball teams, based in Salt Lake City, Utah between 1911 and 1970 under various names. After minor league baseball first began in Salt Lake City in 1900, the Bees were long-time members of both the Pacific Coast League and Pioneer League. The Salt Lake Bees played their home games at Derks Field.

History
Salt Lake hosted two teams in the 1900 Independent Utah-Idaho Intermountain League, the  Rio Grande Rios and Short Line Shorts. They were followed by the Salt Lake City White Wings in the 1901 Class D Inter-Mountain League, a team in the 1902 Utah State League and the Salt Lake City Elders (1903-1904)/Salt Lake Fruit Pickers (1905) of the Pacific National League. The 1909 Salt Lake City Mormons played in the Inter-Mountain League and the 1909 Salt Lake City Cubs played in the Montana State League

The direct predecessor to the Bees were the Salt Lake City Skyscrapers that played in the class-D Union Association from 1911–1914. The Association folded after the 1914 season. However, in 1915, the San Francisco Missions were sold to Utah businessman Bill "Hardpan" Lane who moved the team to Salt Lake City. The club was named the Bees from 1915–1925. Due to the high altitude and the dimensions of the club's Bonneville Park stadium, the Bees recorded some of the best batting records in the PCL during this period.

The club was named the Bees name from 1915–1925. However Lane moved the team to Los Angeles for the 1926 season. Originally they were known as the Hollywood Bees, but soon changed their name to the Hollywood Stars.

The Bees' baseball was still available though in the city with Salt Lake City's team in the Utah–Idaho League from 1926–1928. The team won its first title in their final 1928 season. In 1939 the third incarnation of the Bees was formed and played in the Pioneer League, winning titles in 1946 and 1953. The city returned to the Pacific Coast league from 1958–1965, winning the league title in 1959.

From 1967–1968, the city was represented by the Salt Lake City Giants, who again played in the Pioneer League, now a rookie-level class league. The team was affiliated with the San Francisco Giants The team played the 1969 and 1970 seasons renamed as the Bees.

After their 1969, the club returned to Triple-A status and the Pacific Coast League. In 1971 the club was renamed the Salt Lake City Angels, when they became the affiliate of the California Angels through the 1974 season. In their first season as the Angels, the club won the southern division of the Pacific Coast League with a 78-68 record. The team would then go on to defeat the Tacoma Twins 3 games to 1 to claim the league pennant. The team was renamed the Salt Lake City Gulls in 1975 but remained as the Angels' top affiliate through the 1981 season. In 1979, the team were able to sweep the Hawaii Islanders and capture their final league title.

In 1982, The Gulls switched to the Seattle Mariners organization. Following the 1984 season, the team was relocated to Calgary, Alberta, and became the Calgary Cannons in 1985.

The current minor league team in the city, the Salt Lake Buzz chose their name in part to pay homage to the Bees heritage. In November 2005, the Buzz, now the Salt Lake Stingers, changed their name to the Salt Lake Bees, reviving the name once again.

Notable players
Lefty Gomez (1928) Inducted, Baseball Hall of Fame
Jeff Newman, MLB All-Star catcher and manager

Year-by-year record

References

External links
Historic Baseball

See also
Salt Lake Bees – (includes Buzz, Stingers)
Salt Lake City Trappers

Baseball teams established in 1915
Baseball teams disestablished in 1970
Defunct Pacific Coast League teams
Defunct Pioneer League (baseball) teams
Sports in Salt Lake City
Professional baseball teams in Utah
Defunct baseball teams in Utah
California Angels minor league affiliates
Seattle Mariners minor league affiliates
Pittsburgh Pirates minor league affiliates
Chicago Cubs minor league affiliates
San Francisco Giants minor league affiliates
Philadelphia Phillies minor league affiliates
San Diego Padres minor league affiliates
Cleveland Guardians minor league affiliates
1911 establishments in Utah
1984 disestablishments in Utah